"I Still Believe in Waltzes" is a song recorded by American country music artist Conway Twitty on his 1980 album Rest Your Love on Me. The following year, Twitty recorded a duet version with Loretta Lynn that was released in May 1981 as the second single from their tenth duet album Two's a Party. The song peaked at number 2 on the Billboard Hot Country Singles chart. It also reached number 3 on the RPM Country Tracks chart in Canada.

Chart performance

References

External links
 Lyrics of this song
 

1981 singles
Conway Twitty songs
Loretta Lynn songs
Songs written by Johnny MacRae
Songs written by Bob Morrison (songwriter)
Song recordings produced by Owen Bradley
Male–female vocal duets
Waltzes
MCA Records singles
1981 songs